Ladies in Waiting (Czech: Čekanky) is a 1940 Czech romantic comedy film directed by Vladimír Borský. The film sets were designed by the art director Jan Zázvorka.

Cast
 Zorka Janů as Jiřina Krátká  
 Meda Valentová as Kristina  
 Anna Letenská as Marie  
 Marie Nademlejnská as Jitka  
 František Smolík as Pilníček  
 Ladislav Pešek as Ráček 
 Jiří Steimar as Baron  
 František Kreuzmann as Old count
 Svatopluk Beneš as Vojtěch Plichta  
 Vladimír Řepa as Josef Ptáček
 Ferenc Futurista as Clerk Hřídelíček  
 Jára Kohout as Clerk Hlavín  
 Ota Motyčka as Clerk Skokan  
 František Roland as Poklasný  
 Vlasta Matulová as Toninka, Ráček's bride
 Vítězslav Boček as Myslivecký mládenec

References

External links 
 

1940 films
Czech romantic comedy films
1940 romantic comedy films
1940s Czech-language films
Films directed by Vladimír Borský
Czechoslovak black-and-white films
Czechoslovak romantic comedy films
1940s Czech films